The Ministry of Construction (Minstroy) was a government ministry in the Soviet Union.

History
A ukase of 15 March 1953 combined the Ministry of Construction of Heavy Industry Enterprises USSR and the Ministry of Construction of Machine-Building Enterprises USSR into the all-union Ministry of Construction USSR. Nikolay Aleksandrovich Dygay was appointed Minister of Construction USSR. In January 1954, D. Ya. Rayzer was First Deputy Minister of Construction USSR. Goldin was a Deputy Minister of Construction USSR in April 1954.

In August 1986 the construction ministries were reorganized by geographical regions. The Ministry of Construction was the basis for the Ministry of Construction in the Northern and Western Regions, while the Ministry of Industrial Construction was the basis for the Ministry of Construction in the Southern Regions. A Ministry of Construction in the Eastern Regions of the USSR was also established, becoming responsible for coordinating construction work from Lake Baikal to the Pacific coast.

List of ministers
Source:
 Nikolai Dygai (15.3.1953 - 10.5.1957)
 Georgi Karavajev (21.2.1967 - 25.1.1986)
 Vladimir Reshetilov (25.1.1986 - 2.9.1986)

References

Construction
Soviet Union